Chhawrtui is a village in the Khawzawl district of Mizoram, India. It is located in the Khawzawl R.D. Block. The Tuivawl river rises near the Chhawrtui village.

Demographics 

According to the 2011 census of India, Chhawrtui has 194 households. The effective literacy rate (i.e. the literacy rate of population excluding children aged 6 and below) is 95.46%.

References 

Villages in Khawzawl block